El Escondido (Spanish for "The Hidden One") is a volcano of the Central Ranges of the Colombian Andes in the department of Caldas.

The volcano, a pyroclastic ring, was discovered in the Selva de Florencia National Natural Park in Samaná, in 2013 on the basis of volcanic products of the volcano, different from those of San Diego to the northeast. The volcano formed approximately 30,000 years ago. The volcano overlies the Early Eocene Florencia Stock.

See also 
 List of volcanoes in Colombia
 List of volcanoes by elevation

References

Bibliography

Maps 
 
 

Mountains of Colombia
Volcanoes of Colombia
Andean Volcanic Belt
Geography of Caldas Department